Centrix is a fictional superhero in the DC universe and a member of the superhero team the Global Guardians.

Fictional character biography
Mark Armstrong is a metahuman with the ability to project energy force waves from his body. He also has small projectiles that can be propelled by his energy force waves. He uses his powers to stop criminals in his native Canada and is a practitioner of New Age philosophies.

In Justice League Quarterly #17 (Winter 1994), he joins the Global Guardians after one of their darkest periods. One of their old enemies, Fain Y'Onia, attacks and kills Bushmaster and Thunderlord. Godiva, Impala and Tuatara are badly injured. The Wild Huntsman is missing in action, having vanished in the seeming defeat of Fain.

The survivors recruit Centrix, along with Tundra, Chrysalis and Cascade.

References

External links
Centrix at the Unofficial Guide to the DC Universe

DC Comics superheroes
Characters created by Paul Kupperberg
Comics characters introduced in 1994
Canadian superheroes
DC Comics metahumans